Ralph Lazar  (born 1967) is an artist, illustrator and a New York Times Bestselling author.

Life
Ralph Lazar was born in Johannesburg, South Africa in 1967, and has degrees in law & economics from the University of Cape Town and The London School of Economics. After university he worked at Goldman Sachs and Credit Suisse.

He is married to the artist Lisa Swerling, has two children, and lives in Marin County, California

Art
Ralph Lazar’s art contemporaneously documents global politics, with a focus on the US. Lazar creates pieces in real-time, as the news unfolds. His work has been showcased at Art Basel Miami, The LA Art Show, Art Palm Springs and Art Market San Francisco amongst others. In January and February 2020, his artwork appeared on 1,700 LinkNYC digital screens across New York City.

Recurring themes through his work are current affairs, race relations, Civil Rights, US Presidential history, the US Supreme Court and the US Constitution.

Illustration and writing
Partnering with his wife Lisa Swerling, he is also known for his illustrative works Happiness Is, Harold's Planet, Vimrod and The Brainwaves.

Happiness Is was first published by Chronicle Books of San Francisco. Rights have been sold in 20 languages. Harold's Planet and Vimrod have been published by Penguin Books, HarperCollins and Andrews McMeel and sell as greetings cards in the millions. The Brainwaves are cartoon characters that populate Dorling Kindersley's children's reference titles, published in 22 languages. 

Their artwork appeared weekly in The Financial Times and The Scotsman from 2006 to 2009. With Lisa Swerling, he co-authored the book Me Without You which was on the New York Times Bestseller List in March 2015.

Awards and nominations include The Royal Society Prizes for Science Books (2008), Annecy International Animated Film Festival Grand Prix winner 1998 (International Project Competition), The Royal Society Prizes for Science Books (2007), The Washington Post Book of the Week (April 2007) and The US Parents' Choice Award 2006 and 2009.

Notes

External links
 ralphlazar.com

Alumni of the London School of Economics
People from Muswell Hill
Living people
1967 births
University of Cape Town alumni
People from Marin County, California